Church Town is a hamlet in the parish of Redruth, Cornwall, England.

References

Hamlets in Cornwall
Redruth